Senoner is a surname. Notable people with the surname include:

Carlo Senoner (born 1943), Italian alpine skier
Inge Senoner (born 1940), Italian alpine skier
Simona Senoner (1993–2011), Italian cross-country racer and ski jumper
Tobia Senoner (1913–date of death unknown), Italian cross-country skier
Wilfried Senoner (1945–1999), Italian artist